The History of Michigan Wolverines football in the Elliott years covers the history of the University of Michigan Wolverines football program during the period from the promotion of Bump Elliott as head coach in 1959 through his resignation after the 1968 season.  Michigan was a member of the Big Ten Conference and played its home games at Michigan Stadium during the Elliott years.  During the 10 years in which Elliott served as head football coach, Michigan compiled a record of 51–42–2 and claimed one Big Ten championship, one Rose Bowl victory, and two Chicago Tribune Silver Football awards for the most valuable player in the Big Ten.  However, the Wolverines finished higher than third place in the Big Ten only twice.

The 1964 team compiled a 9–1 record, won the Big Ten championship, defeated Oregon State in the 1965 Rose Bowl, and finished the season ranked No. 4 in both the AP and UPI polls.  Quarterback Bob Timberlake was selected as an All-American and won the 1964 Chicago Tribune Silver Football award.  After losing to Michigan by a 34–7 score in the Rose Bowl, Oregon State coach Tommy Prothro opined that the 1964 Wolverines were "the greatest football team he has ever seen."

In Elliott's final year as head coach, the 1968 team compiled an 8–2 record (6–1 Big Ten) and was ranked No. 12 in the final AP Poll.  Running back Ron Johnson won the Chicago Tribune Silver Football award and broke Michigan's single-game and single-season rushing records.  Johnson's 347-yard rushing performance against Wisconsin still stands as Michigan's single-game record.  The 1968 team also included a core of young players who became stars in the early years of the Schembechler era.

Four Michigan football players from the Elliott years have been inducted into the College Football Hall of Fame.  They are Tom Curtis (halfback and defensive back, 1967–1969), Dan Dierdorf (offensive tackle, 1968–1970), Ron Johnson (halfback, 1966–1968), and Jim Mandich (tight end, 1967–1969).  Dierdorf and a fifth player, Tom Mack (tackle, 1963–1965), have been inducted into the Pro Football Hall of Fame.  A sixth, Dave Raimey (halfback, 1960–1962), has been inducted into the Canadian Football Hall of Fame.

Year-by-year results

Overview

Hiring of Elliott

The 1958 Michigan team compiled a 2–6–1 record under 11th-year head coach Bennie Oosterbaan.  On November 14, 1958, before the final two losses of the season had been recorded, Oosterbaan announced that he was resigning effective at the end of the season.  University officials announced that Bump Elliott would succeed Oosterbaan as the head football coach in 1959.  Elliott had played for Michigan under Fritz Crisler and had won the Chicago Tribune Silver Football award in 1947 as the most valuable player in the Big Ten Conference.  Elliott had held several assistant coaching positions since 1948, including a position as the backfield coach at Michigan during the 1957 and 1958 seasons.  At age 33, he became the youngest head coach in the conference.

Elliott promptly shook up the coaching staff, retaining only two of Oosterbaan's assistants.  He hired three young, new assistant coaches: Jack Fouts from Bowling Green, Jack "Jocko" Nelson from Colorado, and Henry Fonde, Elliott's former teammate who was coaching high school football in Ann Arbor.  Predicting that he would require three to five years to rebuild and win a championship, Elliott discarded the single-wing formation that had been the mainstay at Michigan since Fritz Crisler arrived in the late 1930s.  In its place, Elliott installed an offense which he referred to as the "winged-T."

1959 to 1963 seasons
On September 26, 1959, the Elliott years officially got underway with a home game against the Missouri Tigers.  The Tigers upset the Wolverines, 20–15.  The following week, the Wolverines were again defeated in a home game against Michigan State by a score of 34–8.   The 1959 team finished with a record of 4–5, including victories over rivals Minnesota and Ohio State.  Fred Julian led the 1959 team with 289 rushing yards, and quarterback Stan Noskin led the team in total offense with 697 passing yards.  The 1959 season was regarded as "not bad for a rebuilding year," and the team's 4–5 record was an improvement on the prior two-win season.  A post-season appraisal by the Associated Press referred to the 1959 Wolverines as "resurgent" and "scrappy."  Elliott called it "an encouraging and enjoyable year" and noted that his team was "able to give almost every team we played a real contest."

In 1960, the team again showed improvement, compiling a 5–4 record and outscoring opponents by a total of 133 to 84.  Bennie McRae led the team with 342 rushing yards, and quarterback Dave Glinka totaled 755 passing yards.

The rebuilding process continued in 1961 as the team improved to a 6–3 record and outscored opponents 212 to 163.  For the first time in the Elliott years, a Michigan player was selected as an All-Big Ten player, with Bennie McRae being picked as an All-Big Ten halfback.  Dave Raimey led the team with 496 rushing yards, and quarterback Dave Glinka added 588 passing yards.

The steady improvement in the team's record was reversed in 1962, which marked a low point in the Elliott years.  Before the season began, the team lost three of its best offensive players, end John Henderson, fullback Bruce McLenna, and kicker Doug Bickle, to injuries.  The 1962 Michigan team compiled a 2–7 record (1–6 Big Ten), finished dead last in the conference, and was outscored 214 to 70.  The delta of −144 between points scored and points allowed marked the worst performance in the history of Michigan football, exceeding the previous record of −122 set by the 1934 team.  (The 2008 team compiled a −104 delta for third worst in school history.) Dave Raimey led the team with 385 rushing yards, and quarterback Bob Chandler added 401 passing yards.

The Wolverines continued to struggle in 1963, compiling a 3–4–2 record and finishing in a tie for fifth place in the Big Ten.  In the second game of the season, the Wolverine fell, 26–13, to a Navy team that was ranked No. 6 in the AP Poll and led by Roger Staubach.  Staubach's performance in the game (94 rushing yards and 14 of 16 passing for 237 yards) was called "one of the most remarkable performances in the 36-year history of Michigan Stadium."  The defense improved substantially in 1963, allowing 127 points in nine games, but the offense was limited to 131 points in those same games.  Quarterback Bob Timberlake showed promise with 593 passing yards and 228 rushing yards.  Two Michigan linemen, Tom Keating and Joe O'Donnell, became the second and third Michigan players to be named to All-Big Ten teams during the Elliott years.

At the end of Elliott's first five years as head coach, Michigan had compiled an overall record of 20–23–2 and finished no higher than fifth place in the Big Ten Conference.  No Michigan football players received All-America honors during those years.

1964 season

 
In its sixth year under Bump Elliott, the 1964 Michigan team compiled a 9–1 record and won the Big Ten Conference championship for the first time since 1950.  Although no post-bowl polls were taken in the 1964 season, the Wolverines finished the regular season ranked No. 4 in both the AP and UPI polls.

In the second game of the season, Michigan avenged its 1963 loss to Navy and 1963 Heisman Trophy winner Roger Staubach.  Navy came into the game ranked No. 5 in the country.  This time, the Wolverines were able to stop Staubach and won the game, 21–0.  Michigan intercepted three Navy passes, including two thrown by Staubach.  Staubach was eventually forced from the game, limping after being knocked to the turf by Michigan defensive tackle Bill Yearby.  The game broke a 20-game streak during which the Midshipmen had not been shut out under Staubach.  The New York Times wrote that the Wolverines "brought Roger Staubach, the heroic middie quarterback, back into focus as an ordinary mortal."

The 1964 team narrowly missed an undefeated season, with its only loss coming against a Purdue team led by Bob Griese.  The Wolverines lost to Purdue by a score of 21–20.  Michigan had a chance to tie the game in the fourth quarter, but quarterback Bob Timberlake carried the ball for an attempted two-point conversion and was stopped short of the goal line.

On offense, Timberlake was a triple threat who rushed for 631 yards, passed for 884 yards, and also handled field goals and extra points.  He won the Chicago Tribune Silver Football award as the most valuable player in the conference and was selected as an All-American.  The 1964 team also had a strong running game with Mel Anthony and Carl Ward in the backfield.  The Wolverines rushed for 2,473 yards in 1964 and had four games (Air Force, Minnesota, Northwestern, and Oregon State) in which they rushed for over 300 yards.

On defense, Michigan registered three shutouts (a feat not accomplished by a Michigan team since 1948) and gave up only 83 points, an average of 8.3 points per game.  Team leaders on defense included All-American defensive tackle Bill Yearby, All-Big Ten linebacker Tom Cecchini, and team captain and All-Big Ten end Jim Conley.

1965 Rose Bowl
As the Big Ten champions, the Wolverines advanced to the 1965 Rose Bowl, defeating Oregon State by a score of 34–7.  Michigan fullback Mel Anthony was awarded the Player of the Game trophy after scored three touchdowns, including an 84-yard run in the second quarter that set a Rose Bowl record.  Oregon State coach Tommy Prothro opined after watching game film from the Rose Bowl that the 1964 Wolverines were "the greatest football team he has ever seen."

1965 to 1967 seasons

After winning a Big Ten championship in 1964, and then opening the 1965 season with two victories, the 1965 team was ranked No. 4 in the AP Poll after two weeks of play.  However, the team was crippled by multiple injuries and lost six of the eight remaining games.  The 1965 team ultimately compiled a 4–6 record and tied for seventh place in the conference.  Carl Ward led the team with 639 rushing yards, and quarterback Wally Gabler passed for 825 yards.

The 1966 team improved to 6–4 and tied for third place in the conference standings.  The team featured the strongest passing attack in Michigan history to that point.  Quarterback Dick Vidmer shattered Michigan's single-season records by completing 117 of 225 passes for 1,609 yards and 10 touchdowns.  Vidmer's favorite target was Jack Clancy who caught 76 passes for 1,077 yards in 1966.   After starting the season with impressive victories over Oregon State (41–0) and No. 7-ranked  California (17–7), the Wolverines were ranked No. 9 in the AP Poll.  Three straight losses dropped the team out of the national rankings.  In the final game of the season, the Wolverines defeated rival Ohio State, 17–3.  Dave Fisher led the 1966 team with 672 rushing yards.  Two Wolverines were selected as All-Americans in 1966: safety Rick Volk and end Jack Clancy.   A record five Michigan players were selected as All-Big Ten players in 1966: Volk, Clancy, right guard Don Bailey, halfback Jim Detwiler, fullback Dave Fisher, and linebacker Frank Nunley.

The 1967 team lost five of its first six games, compiled a 4–6 record, and tied for fifth place in the Big Ten standings.  Ron Johnson led the team with 982 rushing yards, while quarterback Dennis Brown led the team in total offense with 928 passing yards and 358 rushing yards.  Center Joe Dayton, linebacker Tom Stincic, and Ron Johnson were  selected as All-Big Ten players in 1967.

1968 season

Michigan opened the 1968 season with a disappointing 21–7 loss at home in Ann Arbor to the California Golden Bears.  After the season opener, the team won eight consecutive games, including a 28–14 victory over a Michigan State team that was ranked No. 12 in the AP Poll and a 27–22 victory over an Indiana team that was ranked No. 19 in the AP Poll.  By mid-November, the Wolverines were ranked No. 4 in both the AP and UPI polls.  On November 16, 1968, running back Ron Johnson rushed for 347 yards against Wisconsin, a mark that still stands as Michigan's single-game rushing record.   Johnson rushed for a total of 1,391 yards in 1968, setting a season rushing record that stood until broken by Rob Lytle in 1976.  Quarterback  Dennis Brown added 1,562 passing yards and 215 rushing yards.

In the final game of the 1968 season, Michigan faced Ohio State.  Michigan came into the game ranked No. 4, and Ohio State was undefeated and ranked No. 2.  Ohio State won the game by a 50–14 score.  Despite having a 36-point lead, Ohio State coach Woody Hayes passed for, and failed to get, a two-point conversion after the final score and with 1:23 remaining in the game.  When asked why he went for the two-point conversion, Hayes reportedly said, "Because we couldn't go for three!"  The 1968 Buckeyes went on to defeat USC in the 1969 Rose Bowl and were recognized as national champions in both the AP and UPI polls.

The 1968 Michigan team included a core of young players (Dan Dierdorf, Jim Mandich, Don Moorhead, Tom Curtis, Marty Huff,  Henry Hill, and Cecil Pryor) who became stars in the early years of the Schembechler era.

Resignation of Elliott
In late December 1968, Elliott resigned as head coach and accepted a new position as Michigan's associate athletic director. Less than a week later, Bo Schembechler was announced as Elliott's replacement.

There were reports during the 1968 season that Elliott had been given an ultimatum: "Either win or face the possibility of being kicked upstairs."   Don Canham, who took over as athletic director in 1968, later denied that Elliott was "eased out" of his job.  Canham said: "Bump and I are close personal friends.  Bump is not naïve – he knows that when you work at a place for 10 years and you're not winning consistently, it doesn't become fun for anybody – the coach, the alumni, the players or anybody else.  We talked about this and we talked about it openly.  If Bump had said to me, 'Look, give me a couple of more years,' I would have given it to him.  I mean that.  I didn’t fire Bump Elliott.  My first year as director Bump had an 8 and 2 record.  Anyone could live with that."

Schembechler later recalled that he remained loyal to Elliott when he took over as Michigan's head coach.  When Schembechler's 1969 team won the Big Ten championship, he said, "I made certain I let everyone know I won with Bump's kids.  Bump was a man of great class and he showed it to me again and again in that first year, never getting in the way, always trying to be helpful, always trying to encourage me."  After Michigan won the 1969 Ohio State game, the team presented the game ball to Elliott, and Schembechler noted that "I don't remember when I felt happier about anything in my life."  After two years as Michigan's associate athletic director, Elliott was hired as Iowa's athletic director in 1970.

Rivalries
Elliott was the first head coach in Michigan history to compile losing records in all three of Michigan's principal rivalries with Michigan State, Minnesota, and Ohio State.  Elliott compiled an overall record of 9–20–1 in those series.

Michigan State

During the Elliott years, Michigan compiled a  2–7–1 record in the Michigan – Michigan State football rivalry.  Duffy Daugherty was the head coach of Michigan State throughout the Elliott years.  Significant games during the Elliott-Daugherty years include:
In 1960, Dennis Fitzgerald set a Michigan record with a 99-yard kickoff return for a touchdown in the second quarter, and the Wolverines led, 17–14, at halftime.  With less than three minutes remaining in the game, Carl Charon scored a touchdown for Michigan State to give the Spartans a 24–17 victory.
In 1961 and 1962, Michigan State shut out Michigan by identical scores of 28–0.
In 1964, Michigan came into the Michigan State game having last beaten a Michigan State team in 1955—the Wolverines' longest winless streak in their in-state rivalry.  The game matched two teams ranked in the Top 10 in the AP Poll and attracted "the largest crowd ever assembled at Spartan Stadium" up to that time.  Trailing 10 to 3 halfway through the fourth quarter, Michigan scored 14 points in the final seven minutes in a comeback led by sophomore halfback Rick Sygar.  With seven minutes remaining, Sygar caught a five-yard touchdown pass from Bob Timberlake.  On the final drive, he took a pitch from Timberlake at the Michigan State 31-yard line and threw a touchdown pass to John Henderson.  Having missed a two-point conversion attempt on the first Michigan touchdown, Timberlake threw to Steve Smith for the two-point conversion on the final score.  Michigan defeated the Spartans 17–10.
In 1965, the Wolverines lost by a 24–7 score to a Michigan State team that went on to be recognized as national champions in the UPI Coaches Poll.
In 1966, the Wolverines lost by a 20–7 score to a Michigan State team that compiled an undefeated 9–0–1 record (7–0 Big Ten).  The only blemish on the record of the 1966 Spartans was a tie with No. 1 Notre Dame. 
In 1968, Michigan ended a three-game losing streak to Michigan State.  The Spartans entered the game ranked No. 12 in the AP poll but fell to the Wolverines by a score of 28 to 14.

Minnesota

During the Elliott years, Michigan compiled a 4–6 record in its annual Little Brown Jug rivalry game with the Minnesota Golden Gophers.  Murray Warmath was the head coach at Minnesota throughout the Elliott years.  Significant games during the Elliott-Warmath years include:
In 1960, Minnesota defeated Michigan 10–0 in Ann Arbor.  The 1960 Golden Gophers went on to win the Big Ten championship but lost to Washington in the 1961 Rose Bowl.
In 1964, Michigan defeated Minnesota 19–12 in Ann Arbor.  Prior to 1964, Michigan had lost four consecutive games to Minnesota.  Michigan led the game 19–0 in the fourth quarter and held off a comeback attempt by the Golden Gophers.  Minnesota scored two fourth-quarter touchdowns, but missed twice on two-point conversion attempts.  The Golden Gophers closed the score to 19–12 on a 91-yard interception return by Kraig Lofquist. They subsequently drove to the Michigan three-yard line, but the Michigan defense held on fourth down.
In 1967, Minnesota beat Michigan, 20–15, in Minneapolis.  The 1967 Golden Gophers went on to tie with Indiana for the Big Ten championship.

Ohio State

During the Elliott years, Michigan compiled a 3–7 record in the Michigan–Ohio State football rivalry.  Woody Hayes was the head coach at Ohio State throughout the Elliott years.  Significant games during the Elliott-Hayes years include:
In 1959, Michigan won its first game against Ohio State during the Elliott years.  The Wolverines defeated the Buckeyes, 23–13, in front of a capacity crowd of 90,093 spectators at Michigan Stadium.  After Ohio State fumbled the opening kickoff, Michigan scored on a touchdown pass from Stan Noskin to Tony Rio with only one minute and ten seconds having been played.  Michigan scored additional touchdowns on runs by Noskin and Rio.
In 1961, Ohio State came into the game ranked No. 2 in the AP Poll behind Alabama.  The Buckeyes defeated the Wolverines, 50–20, in Ann Arbor.  Despite taking a large lead, Woody Hayes kept his first-string players in the game.  The Toledo Blade wrote that Hayes' desire to impress pollsters and to establish Bob Ferguson as the Heisman Trophy winner "precluded showing a trace of mercy to a badly crippled Michigan team, hurt by the absence of several first stringers."  Hayes noted, "It was a question of being No. 1 or No. 2 in the country and we want to be No. 1.  A couple of extra touchdowns wouldn't hurt Michigan."  Despite an 8–0–1 record and the one-sided score against Michigan, the Buckeyes were unable to overtake Alabama and finished the season ranked No. 2 in the AP and UPI polls.
In 1963, the Michigan – Ohio State game was set for November 23, but President John F. Kennedy was assassinated on November 22.  The game was postponed after a request from Michigan Governor George W. Romney to allow mourning for President Kennedy.  When the game was played a week later, it attracted a crowd of 36,424, the smallest at Michigan Stadium in 20 years.  Michigan took a 10–0 lead, but Ohio State scored 14 unanswered points.  Michigan drove to Ohio State's seven-yard-line with less than two minutes remaining, but a pass into the end zone on fourth down fell out of the hands of halfback Dick Rindfuss.
In 1964, Michigan concluded its regular season with a 10–0 victory over Ohio State in Columbus.  The game was played with winds blowing at 23 miles an hour and temperatures in the low 20s.  Michigan scored its first touchdown on a 17-yard touchdown pass from Bob Timberlake to Jim Detwiler with 44 seconds remaining in the first half.  The touchdown followed a 50-yard punt by Stan Kempe.  Ohio State's Bo Rein lost the punt in the sun, fumbled, and the ball was recovered by John Henderson.   The only other points in the game came on a 27-yard field goal by Timberlake.  With the victory, Michigan won the Big Ten Conference championship for the first time in 14 years.
In 1965, Ohio State defeated Michigan, 9–7, on a field goal by Bob Funk with 1:15 remaining in the game.  Michigan then drove the ball to Ohio State's 34-yard-line with 10 seconds remaining.  A 50-yard field goal attempt by Paul D'Eramo fell short.
In 1966, Michigan defeated Ohio State, 17–3, as Toledo native Jim Detwiler rushed for 140 yards and a touchdown.  Dick Vidmer also threw a touchdown pass to Clayton Wilhite.  The defeat gave Ohio State a losing record for only the second time in the Woody Hayes era.
In 1968, Michigan came into the game ranked No. 4, and Ohio State was undefeated and ranked No. 2.  Ohio State won the game by a 50–14 score.  Despite having a 36-point lead, Ohio State coach Woody Hayes passed for, and failed to get, a two-point conversion with 1:23 remaining in the game.  When asked why he went for the two points, Hayes reportedly said, "Because we couldn't go for three!"  The 1968 Buckeyes went on to defeat USC in the 1969 Rose Bowl and were recognized as national champions in both the AP and UPI polls.

Illinois

From 1960 to 1966, Michigan's games against Illinois took on heightened significance as the games matched Bump Elliott against his brother Pete Elliott, who was Illinois' head coach.  The Elliott brothers had played together on the undefeated 1947 Michigan Wolverines football team and were both later inducted into the College Football Hall of Fame.  In the seven games matching the two brothers against each other, Michigan compiled a record of 6–1.  In his history of the Michigan football program, former publicity director Will Perry joked about the Elliott years: "Two things were becoming clear about Michigan football.  There would be injuries, and Bump Elliott's team would beat Pete Elliott's Illinois team."

Notre Dame
Michigan and Notre Dame did not play each other during the Elliott years.   After playing against each other in 1942 and 1943, the programs did not meet again until 1978.

Coaching staff and administration

Assistant coaches
William Dodd – assistant coach, 1966–1968
Don Dufek, Sr. – player, 1948–1950; assistant coach, 1954–1965 (later athletic director at Grand Valley State, 1972–1976, and at Kent State, 1976–1980)
Dennis Fitzgerald – player, 1959–1960; assistant coach, 1963–1968 (later head coach of Kent State, 1975–1977, assistant coach for the Pittsburgh Steelers, 1982–1988)
Henry Fonde – player, 1945–1947; assistant coach, 1959–1968
Jack Fouts – assistant coach, 1959–1963 (later head coach of Ohio Wesleyan, 1964–1983, and Cornell, 1989)
Bob Hollway – player, 1947–1948; assistant coach, 1954–1965 (later head coach of the St. Louis Cardinals, 1971–1972)
Don James – assistant coach, 1966–1967 (later head coach at Kent State, 1971–1974, and Washington, 1975–1992)
Frank Maloney – assistant coach, 1968–1973 (later head coach at Syracuse, 1974–1980)
George Mans – player, 1959–1961; assistant coach, 1966–1973 (later head coach at Eastern Michigan, 1974–1975)
Tony Mason – assistant coach, 1964–1968 (later head coach at Cincinnati, 1973–1976, and Arizona, 1977–1979)
Y C McNease – assistant coach 1966–1967 (later head coach at Idaho, 1968–1969)
Jack Nelson – assistant coach, 1959–1965 (later head coach at Gustavus Adolphus, 1966–1970, assistant coach for Minnesota Vikings, 1971–1978)
Robert Shaw – assistant coach, 1968

Others
Don Canham – athletic director, 1968–1988
Fritz Crisler – athletic director, 1941–1968 
Jim Hunt – trainer, 1947–1967
Lindsy McLean – trainer, 1968–1978 (later trainer of the San Francisco 49ers, 1979–2003)
Marcus Plant – University of Michigan's faculty representative to the National Collegiate Athletic Association and the Big Ten Conference, 1954–1978

Players

References

Michigan Wolverines football in the Elliott years
Michigan Wolverines football